The Changchun EMU or CNR Changchun EMU is an electric multiple unit train type of the Mass Transit Railway (MTR) system in Hong Kong. Designed and manufactured by Changchun Railway Vehicles, a member of CNR group (now merged with CSR to form CRRC), they were the first MTR heavy-rail stock to be manufactured in Mainland China, while past orders came from England, Japan, Europe or South Korea.

The trains come in two versions: the C-Train, a manned eight-car train which is used mainly on the Kwun Tong line; and the S-Train, a driverless three-car variant which operates on the South Island line since its opening in December 2016. Similar trains had been ordered for the Tuen Ma line, also known as TML C-Train, which entered service on the Ma On Shan line on 12 March 2017; however, these trains bear a resemblance to the older SP1900 EMUs.

History
Designed in 18 months, the first C-Train rolled off the production lines at CNR's plant on 6 December 2010. It was transported to Hong Kong on 28 April 2011. By 16 October, 4 sets had arrived and were undergoing testing on the Kwun Tong line, where were first expected enter service sometime in November of the same year.

On 22 July 2011, MTR ordered 12 eight-car C-trains to increase the urban line fleet for the West Island line extension and 10 three-car S-Trains for the first phase of the South Island line.

The first C-Train entered service on the Kwun Tong line on Wednesday, 7 December 2011 in the evening. They were introduced on 29 May 2012 to the Tsuen Wan line and on 13 May 2013 to the Tseung Kwan O line. The last of the 8-car trains was handed over on 5 September 2013, and entered service on the Kwun Tong line shortly after.

The S-Trains began operating on 28 December 2016, the day the South Island line commenced service.

Train configurations

Kwun Tong line (contract number C6554-07E - 22 sets)
The trains used on the Kwun Tong line are configured as eight-car sets. All intermediate cars (B cars and C cars) have motors, while the control cars (A cars) have no motors. The C cars also come with pantographs; there are three of these cars per train set. Unlike the K-Train and CAF-Train, the C-Train reverts to the use of double-leaf sliding doors, first used on the M-Train. These trains also feature new 22" LCD TVs, like their counterparts on former KCR lines, and as a result are equipped with MTR In-Train TV, offering infotainment such as news and announcements. This will become standard for all future rolling stock ordered by the MTR.

South Island line (contract number C6554-12E - 10 sets)
In this configuration for the South Island line , the pantograph is situated on the end cars (A car), while all three cars will have a motor each (no trailer cars). Like the converted M-Trains used on the Disneyland Resort line, these trains are fully automated, but unlike the DRL trains, the driver's cab has been replaced by extra passenger space, with an unobstructed view out the front windows (similar to that of the HKIA automated people mover). However, every train has at least one staff for patrol in the traffic hour who are able to control the train manually because of the requirement of the Fire Services Department since its commencement. The trains feature a different interior compared to the Kwun Tong Line configuration as well as a different paint scheme and headlight styling. Designed in sixteen months, all ten three-car trains are now in service.

References

External links

Mockup display
Latest updates on construction progress
First production train at CNR plant
Train connected to locomotive
Train at Shop
First video of propulsion capture during testing
Another one
 https://web.archive.org/web/20140318191939/http://www.mtr-southislandline.hk/pdf/press-release/26022014_pr_e.pdf
Motor specifacations for South Island Line Rolling Stock

MTR rolling stock
Electric multiple units of Hong Kong
Changchun Railway Vehicles
CRRC multiple units
1500 V DC multiple units